Bénédicte Décary is a Canadian actress. She is most noted for her performance as Nicole Bélanger in the film Through the Mist (Dédé, à travers les brumes), for which she was a Jutra Award nominee for Best Supporting Actress at the 12th Jutra Awards in 2010, and her recurring role as Eva Arcady in the television series Durham County, for which she was a Gemini Award nominee for Best Supporting Actress in a Drama Program or Series at the 26th Gemini Awards in 2011.

She is married to actor François Papineau, with whom she costarred in the 2021 television series Entre deux draps.

Filmography

Film

Television

References

External links

21st-century Canadian actresses
Canadian film actresses
Canadian stage actresses
Canadian television actresses
Actresses from Quebec
French Quebecers
Living people
Year of birth missing (living people)